Mikhail Nikolayevich Petrolay (born 19 August 1994) is a Russian football midfielder. He plays for FC Dynamo Vologda

Club career
He made his debut in the Russian Second Division for FC Rubin-2 Kazan on 18 April 2012 in a game against FC Volga Ulyanovsk.

He made his Russian Football National League debut for FC Neftekhimik Nizhnekamsk on 8 March 2017 in a game against FC Zenit-2 Saint Petersburg.

References

External links
 Career summary by sportbox.ru  
 

1994 births
Living people
Russian footballers
Russian expatriate footballers
Association football midfielders
Kazakhstan Premier League players
FC Rubin Kazan players
FC Zhetysu players
Expatriate footballers in Kazakhstan
FC Neftekhimik Nizhnekamsk players
FC Dynamo Vologda players